The South African Railways Class NG6 4-4-0 of 1895 was an ex-Mozambican narrow-gauge steam locomotive from the Beira Railway era.

Between 1895 and 1898, Pauling and Company placed 42 Falcon-built types F2 and F4 tender steam locomotives with a 4-4-0 American type wheel arrangement in service on the two-foot narrow-gauge line which was being constructed for the Beira Railway in Mozambique. In 1915, thirteen of these locomotives were acquired by the South African Railways to replace locomotives which had been commandeered by the Union Defence Forces for use in German South West Africa during the First World War.

At the end of the war, these locomotives were staged, but in 1921 they were placed back in service by the South African Railways. When a system of grouping narrow-gauge locomotives into classes was eventually introduced somewhere between 1928 and 1930, they were designated Class NG6.

The Beira Railway
Construction of the first  narrow-gauge railway in Southern Africa began in 1892. This was the  line of the narrow-gauge Beira Railway which eventually stretched from Beira in Mozambique to Umtali across the Rhodesian border. The border was reached in October 1897 and the full line to Umtali was opened to traffic on 4 February 1898. The work was undertaken by Pauling and Company and was subcontracted to Alfred Lawley.

Manufacturers and characteristics

Between 1895 and 1898, the Beira Railway placed 42 Falcon types F2 and F4 tender steam locomotives with a  American type wheel arrangement in service, supplied in six batches by Falcon Engine and Car Works Limited in England and the Glasgow Railway Engineering Company in Scotland. In service, these locomotives were soon nicknamed Lawleys, after the Beira Railway construction subcontractor.

Falcon F2

The first of the Falcon F2 loco­motives differed from later models of its class by having a cab which was similar to the Beira Railway's earlier three  locomotives, with two rectangular louvred cab windows on each side. Its boiler dome was fitted with a Salter safety valve. The locomotive was delivered by Falcon in 1895 and was numbered BR4.

A further five F2 locomotives were ordered from Falcon and were also delivered in 1895, numbered in the range from BR5 to BR9. They differed in appearance from the first F2 locomotive by having larger single cab windows.

Falcon F4

The next six locomotives which were ordered from Falcon in 1896, were of an altered design.

At the end of 1896, another four of these engines were delivered from Falcon, numbered in the range from BR16 to BR19. They were similar to the previous batches, but had larger three-axle tenders with an increased water capacity.

The last sixteen Falcon-built locomotives were all delivered in 1897, numbered in the range from BR20 to BR35. All these Falcon-built F2 and F4 locomotives bore their engine numbers on the sandboxes on their running boards, in the form of individual brass letters and numbers.

Glasgow F4
The construction of the last batch of ten F4 locomotives was subcontracted by Falcon to the Glasgow Railway Engineering Company in Scotland. They were built and delivered in 1898, numbered in the range from BR36 to BR45. The Glasgow locomotives had wasp-waisted safety valves and their engine numbers, also mounted on the sandboxes, were cast oval brass plates.

The manufacturing company in Glasgow was formed by Dugald Drummond in 1891, as Dugald Drummond and Sons. In 1895, when Dugald left to take up the post as locomotive engineer of the London and South Western Railway, the name of the business was changed to the Glasgow Railway Engineering Company, with his sons continuing to manage the works. While the earlier locomotives were known as the Falcon F2 and Falcon F4, this last batch of Glasgow-built locomotives were often referred to as the Drummond F4, in spite of its builder's name change.

Fowler tenders
In addition to the three-axle tenders which were delivered with all the F2 and F4 locomotives, two larger bogie tenders were ordered from John Fowler and Company of Leeds. One of these was attached to no. BR5 after its three-axle tender was wrecked in an accident. Both these bogie tenders later turned up in South Africa, attached to numbers BR6 and BR8.

Service

Beira Railway

In service, it turned out that the Lawleys were not adequate to the task. Since rapid growth in traffic soon overwhelmed the narrow-gauge line, it was widened to Cape gauge by 1900. As a result, the whole Lawley locomotive fleet, together with the rest of the Beira Railway's narrow-gauge locomotives, were staged at Bamboo Creek (Villa Machado) near Beira, with the exception of those locomotives which were required for the Ayrshire Railway which was still under construction at the time.

Ayrshire Railway
The Ayrshire Railway used much of the redundant Beira Railway equipment, including six of the F4 locomotives, one of them Falcon-built and the other five Glasgow-built. They remained in service there until this line was also converted to Cape gauge in 1914 and became the Sinoia branch of the Beira, Mashonaland and Rhodesia Railway.

Union Defence Force
During the First World War, when South African forces conducted a campaign to drive German forces from Deutsch-Südwest-Afrika (DSWA), narrow-gauge locomotives were urgently required on the Otavi Railway in that territory to replace those which were destroyed by the retreating German forces. Several South African Railways (SAR) locomotives from the various narrow-gauge lines were therefore commandeered by the Union Defence Forces (UDF). To replace these, thirteen of the Lawleys in staging at Bamboo Creek were purchased by the South African Department of Defence and brought to South Africa in 1915. They were renumbered in the range from NG96 to NG108 and, after being repaired, nine of them were placed in service while the other four were cannibalised for spare parts.
 Numbers NG96, NG97 and NG98 were placed in service on the Hopefield line from Kalbaskraal to Saldanha.
 Numbers NG101, NG102 and NG103 were placed in service on the Langkloof line from Port Elizabeth to Avontuur.
 Numbers NG104, NG105 and NG106 were placed in service on the various Natal branches.

As the DSWA campaign drew to a close and many of the ex-German narrow-gauge locomotives were repaired, the SAR locomotives on active service gradually returned to their home lines in South Africa. As a result, the Lawleys were staged once again after less than two years of service in South Africa.

South African Railways

In 1921, Lawley numbers NG101 and NG102 were re-commissioned and placed in SAR service on the branchline from Pienaarsrivier to Pankop, off the mainline between Pretoria and Pietersburg. The Lawleys were the smallest tender steam locomotives to ever see service on the SAR. They performed quite well on this line, since the branch was a light railway with slow speeds and small rolling stock.

During 1924, construction commenced on the narrow-gauge branchline between Upington and Kakamas in the Northern Cape Province and, during 1925, on the branch from Fort Beaufort to Seymour in the Eastern Cape. The remaining Lawleys were then also recovered from storage and placed in service once again. They remained in service when these branchlines were opened to traffic, even though it was usually only in a standby capacity.

Also in 1924, Lawley no. NG98 joined the Dutton road-rail tractors on the narrow-gauge line from Naboomspruit to Singlewood. By 1927, it was joined by no. NG103, but by this time the Singlewood branch was being regauged to Cape gauge and, by 11 June 1928, it was extended to Zebediela.

The system of grouping narrow-gauge locomotives into classes was adopted by the SAR somewhere between 1928 and 1930 and, at that point, the Lawley locomotives were designated Class NG6. The steady increase in loads on the narrow-gauge branches eventually once again proved to be more than the Lawleys were capable of and they were eventually withdrawn. The last one, no. NG103, was retired in 1935.

Industrial
Several Lawleys were sold into private use with some surviving in service until 1957, often being sold or resold between users. Known users were, amongst others, Premier Portland Cement in Bulawayo, the Rhodesian Native Timber Concessions at Gwaai, the Cam and Motor Mine at Gatooma, the Selukwe Peak Light Railway of the Selukwe Chrome Mine, the Lupane Forest Estates, the Igusi Saw Mills and the Arcturus Mine east of Salisbury, all these in Rhodesia. In South Africa, some went to the Zebediela citrus plantations in the northern Transvaal.

Works numbers
Since frames, boilers and tenders were exchanged between locomotives during the process of building nine serviceable locomotives from the thirteen which were purchased from Bamboo Creek in 1915, the original identities of these locomotives were not always accurately recorded. The Lawley locomotive models, builders and works numbers are listed in the table, which includes the engine numbers of those SAR locomotives of which the Beira Railway engine numbers are known.

Preservation
Two locomotives have been restored to running condition at the Sandstone Estates near Ficksburg in the Free State. One is Falcon F2 no. BR7, later SAR no. NG106, which was restored by Sandstone as no. BR7 in the original green Beira Railway livery, while the other is Falcon F4 no. BR25, later SAR no. NG97, which was restored in the black SAR livery.

Illustration
The main picture shows the restored Falcon F2, Beira Railway no. BR6, SAR no. NG106, restored as no. BR7, at Sandstone Estates on 9 April 2006. Those following also illustrate Lawleys in SAR service.

References

2590
4-4-0 locomotives
2′B n2 locomotives
Falcon locomotives
Glasgow Railway Engineering locomotives
2 ft gauge locomotives
Railway locomotives introduced in 1895 
1915 in South Africa